"Unbreakable" is a song by British singer-songwriter from Brighton, Nick Howard who won the second series of The Voice of Germany. The song was released in Germany on 7 December 2012. The song features on his compilation album My Voice Story (2012), the song was also released as the lead single from his upcoming third studio album. The song was written by Nick Howard and produced by Andy Chatterley. It peaked at number 5 in Germany, and has charted in Austria and Switzerland.

Music video
A music video to accompany the release of "Unbreakable" was first released onto YouTube on 19 December 2012 at a total length of three minutes and thirty-six seconds.

Track listing

Credits and personnel
 Lead vocals – Nick Howard
 Producers – Andy Chatterley
 Lyrics – Nick Howard
 Label: Universal Music

Chart performance

Release history

References

2012 singles
Nick Howard songs
Songs written by Nicky Holland
2012 songs
Universal Music Group singles